Youth unemployment in Spain is the unemployment of youth (generally ages 14/15–24) and is different from the general unemployment of Spain. Unemployment describes those who actively search for work but that are without jobs. In Spain, youth unemployment has increasingly become alarming, especially in recent decades, given that the rate of youth unemployment has risen to such high levels. Youth unemployment in Spain rose very much during and following the financial crisis of 2007–2008, and among OCDE nations Spain experienced the largest increase of job losses among young people. The increase in segmentation of the labor market, the lack of effective employment policies and deficiencies in the education system have been cited as some of the principal reasons behind the significant level of youth unemployment in Spain.

Current statistics 
In 2022, 57.9% of young people in Spain were unemployed. From 2008 to 2014, workers younger than 35 had an average loss of purchasing power of 25.7%, more than a quarter of their income. In 2012, Spain had the highest rate of long-term youth unemployment (more than 40%) of the countries in the euro zone. At the end of 2016, the rate of unemployment among young people was 42.91%, 3.3% lower than the previous year (46.2%). Though this may been seen as a sign of improvement, it is still concerning that of the 4.23 million unemployed counted at the end of 2016, 14.5% were youth younger than 25, of which almost 46% were long-term unemployed (more than a year unemployed). Even though the rate of long-term youth unemployment has lowered recently, the fact that it remains high is cause for concern, since the more unemployed youth that exist, the greater the potential effects not only on themselves but on the Spanish economy as a whole.

Causes 
Among the general causes of why young people experience higher unemployment rates than their seniors is the fact that they generally have less work experience, less knowledge about how to find a job and fewer contacts to get jobs. Furthermore, some young people do not have the exact skills that some jobs require of them, resulting in a difficult transition from school to the workforce.

However, there are some labor practices, especially in Europe, which specifically contribute to the problem of youth unemployment in the long term. Young people are more likely to work under temporary contracts. The benefit for companies to use such contracts is that they do not have to follow regulations that make it hard to fire full time workers. About one third of young people employed in advanced economies had temporary employment contracts before the 2008 financial crisis. Half of the young people employed in Spain were using temporary contracts before the crisis and were among the first workers to be fired. This had the double effect of not only leaving young people out of work, but also leaving them without some of the social benefits their jobs provided.

Other causes of the high rate of youth unemployment include leaving school early and the mismatch of supply and demand between work and education level.

Spain suffers from a high rate of school drop outs, which is the percentage of the population between 18 and 24 years old who has not completed secondary education and who has not taken part in any technical training. From 2005 to 2010, Spain recorded a dropout rate of 30.6%; Only Malta (38.0%) and Portugal (34.3%) had higher rates among European Union members. In Spain, there is more concern not just for the number of dropouts, but for the fact that the rate persists and has shown little to do with the economy over the past 15 years.

Consequences and effects 
Youth unemployment affects not only young people, but also the economy on a broader scale, specifically income inequality. As the rate of youth unemployment increased, the gap between the rich and poor in Spain widened. It is estimated that Spain has experienced the widest expansion of income distribution in Europe, as it experienced an increase in income inequality of 18%.

Not finding work has been linked to cause other problems, such as social problems typically linked to youth. The lack of work can lead to a vicious circle of poverty and social problems among young people. On top of that, unemployment can force young people to move away or to start engaging in violence and juvenile delinquency, as well as having low self-esteem and discouragement that can lead to addiction and other health problems in the future. If young people are out of work for too long, they may begin to lose their skills or stop looking for a job altogether - which means that the unemployment rate may not really be indicative of the unemployment picture in Spain.

Recommendations 
The measures approved by the Council of Ministers in 2011 to lower the age of participation in the Initial Professional Qualification Programs (PCPI) to 15 years old, the greater accessibility of facilities and the extension of the programs for up to two years should encourage certain students to remain in the education system longer.

References

Economy of Spain
Labor in Spain
Youth unemployment
Unemployment